Contumacy is a stubborn refusal to obey authority or, particularly in law, the willful contempt of the order or summons of a court (see contempt of court). The term is derived from the Latin word contumacia, meaning firmness or stubbornness.

In English ecclesiastical law, it was contempt of the authority of an ecclesiastical court and was dealt with by the issue of a writ from the Court of Chancery at the instance of the judge of the ecclesiastical court. This writ took the place of the de excommunicato capiendo in 1813, by an act of George III (see excommunication).

In the U.S., while not expressly mentioned in the U.S. Constitution, the courts have long asserted an inherent power of judges to punish such refusal, which in this context is known as contempt of court. The U.S. Supreme Court recognized federal courts' inherent power to imprison a person for contumacy in United States v. Hudson & Goodwin without a reference to a definition of contumacy in common or statutory law.

See also 

 Court-martial
 Insubordination
 Failure to obey a police order
 Mutiny
 Rebellion
 Whistle blower

References

Attribution:

Further reading

Canon law of the Anglican Communion